Franko Škugor (born 20 September 1987) is a Croatian professional tennis player who mainly competes on the ATP Challenger Tour and specialized in doubles. He has a career-high ATP doubles ranking of World No. 17 achieved on 22 April 2019. He is best known for his very powerful serve up to 230 km/h (143 mph) along with very strong groundstrokes. Along with doubles partner and fellow Croatian Nikola Mektić, he reached the doubles semifinals at the 2017 Wimbledon Championships and with Brit Dominic Inglot the semifinals of the 2018 Wimbledon Championships. He also won the 2019 Monte-Carlo Masters with Mektic.

Škugor is a member of HTK Zagreb, his staff is Alan Marić (coach), Jurica Stančić (fitness coach) and Velibor Viboh (physioterapist).

In November 2019, following the departure of Željko Krajan, Škugor captained the Croatia Davis Cup team at the 2019 Davis Cup.

Performance timeline

Doubles 
Current after the 2022 Australian Open.

Significant finals

Masters 1000 finals

Doubles: 1 (1 title)

ATP career finals

Doubles: 9 (6 titles, 3 runner-ups)

Team competition finals: 1 (1 runner-up)

ATP Challenger and ITF Futures finals

Singles: 7 (7–0)

Doubles: 39 (15–24)

Singles

References

External links
 
 
 

1987 births
Living people
Croatian male tennis players
Sportspeople from Šibenik